William Conner (1777–1855) was an American trader, interpreter, scout, community leader, entrepreneur, and politician.

William Conner may also refer to:
William C. Conner, American judge
William Conner (politician), Irish politician
Bill Conner, American businessman
W. W. Conner (William Wallace Conner), American politician in the state of Washington

See also
William Connor (disambiguation)